The Honeoye Falls–Lima Central School District (HFLCSD) serves a student population of 2,748 in New York state. The district includes four schools located on separate sites: Lima Elementary (K–5); Manor Elementary (K–5); Middle School (6–8); and High School (9–12).

Gene Mancuso is the Superintendent of Schools. The HFLCSD comprises  and nine towns in three counties: Monroe County (Mendon, Henrietta and Rush); Livingston County (Avon, Lima and Livonia) and Ontario (Victor, West Bloomfield and Richmond).  The Honeoye Falls–Lima Central School District was established in 1969 through a merger of the neighboring Honeoye Falls and Lima school districts.

Board of Education
The Board of Education consists of nine, non-paid, elected members who reside in the Honeoye Falls–Lima Central School Districts.  Elections are held each May for board members and to vote on the School District budget.

Schools

Elementary schools
Lima Elementary School (K–1) Principal: Allison Cimmerer
Manor Elementary School (2-5) Principal: Joelle Weaver

Middle school
Honeoye Falls–Lima Middle School (6–8) Principal: Jason Juszczak, Assistant Principal: Matthew Weider

High school
Honeoye Falls–Lima High School (9–12) Principal: David Roth, Assistant Principals: Jackie Davern, and Kimberly Muth

References

External links
Honeoye Falls–Lima Central School District Website
New York State School Boards Association

School districts in New York (state)
Education in Monroe County, New York
School districts established in 1969
Education in Livingston County, New York
Education in Ontario County, New York